Chain of Evidence is a 1957 American film noir crime film directed by Paul Landres and starring Bill Elliott, Jimmy Lydon and Don Haggerty. It was the fourth in a series of five films featuring Elliott as a detective in the Los Angeles County Sheriff's Office  made by Allied Artists.

Plot

Cast
 Bill Elliott as Lt. Andy Doyle  
 Jimmy Lydon as Steve Nordstrom 
 Don Haggerty as Sgt. Mike Duncan  
 Claudia Barrett as Harriet Owens  
 Tina Carver as Claire Ramsey  
 Ross Elliott as Bob Bradfield  
 Meg Randall as Polly Gunther  
 Timothy Carey as Carl Fowler  
 John Bleifer as Jake Habermann  
 Dabbs Greer as Dr. Ainsley  
 John Close as Deputy

See also
Dial Red O (1955)
Sudden Danger (1955)
Calling Homicide (1956)
Footsteps in the Night (1957)
List of American films of 1957

References

Bibliography
 James Robert Parish & Michael R. Pitts. Film directors: a guide to their American films. Scarecrow Press, 1974.

External links

1957 films
1957 crime films
American crime films
Films directed by Paul Landres
Allied Artists films
1950s English-language films
1950s American films